Statistics of League of Ireland in the 1978–79 season.

Overview
It was contested by 16 teams, and Dundalk F.C. won the championship.

Final classification

U.C.D. were elected to the league for next season.

Results

Top scorers

League Of Ireland, 1978-79
1978–79 in Republic of Ireland association football
League of Ireland seasons